The United States Croquet Association (USCA) fosters croquet in all its forms, from the familiar nine-wicket croquet game to the modern sport of six-wicket croquet. There are USCA-affiliated clubs and tournaments across the United States and Canada.  The official rules of American Croquet are maintained by the USCA.  The USCA is a member of the World Croquet Federation.

The USCA is headquartered at the National Croquet Center, 700 Florida Mango Road, West Palm Beach, Florida. It has a full-time office staff which keeps regular weekday hours. The USCA provides information on starting a club and print resources, consultation on lawn construction, and maintenance.

History 
In 1977, Jack Osborn organized five Eastern clubs (including the Westhampton Mallet Club, Croquet Club of Bermuda, Green Gables Croquet Club, New York Croquet Club, and Palm Beach Croquet Club) into the United States Croquet Association (USCA), and wrote a new rule book for an American version of the six-wicket sport called American Rules croquet.

It was Jack Osborn's vision, marketing savvy, energy, and sheer dogged determination that brought together five clubs in 1977 to form the nucleus of the United States Croquet Association. Although the sport had long flourished in the Commonwealth countries, croquet had devolved to a backyard pastime in the United States, and there were no agreed-upon rules.

One of the first orders of business of the new association was to hammer out compromise rules acceptable to all five clubs - the Green Gables Croquet Club, the Palm Beach Croquet Club, the New York Croquet Club, the Westhampton Mallet Club, and the Croquet Club of Bermuda. Since then, the list has grown to nearly 400 member clubs with 3500 members, and the rules have survived with minor periodic adjustments.

External links
United States Croquet Association
Directory of USCA Croquet Clubs
Calendar of USCA Croquet Tournaments
Rules of American Croquet (see also synopsis or full rules in PDF)

Member Clubs 
Blantyre Croquet Club in Lenox, Massachusetts
Chicago Croquet Club in Chicago, Illinois
Croquet Club of Vermont in Woodstock, Vermont
Georgetown University Croquet Society in Washington, District of Columbia
Green Gables Croquet Club in Sea Girt, New Jersey
Greenwich Croquet Club in Greenwich, Connecticut
Highlands Croquet Club in Welches, Oregon
Houston Croquet Association in Houston, Texas
Longleaf Bowl & Wicket Club in Pinehurst, North Carolina
Maui Croquet Club in Kihei, Hawaii
National Croquet Club in West Palm Beach, Florida
New York Croquet Club in New York City, New York
Oakland Croquet Club in Oakland, California
Port Royal Croquet Club in Hilton Head Island, South Carolina
Prairie Lights Croquet Club in Manhattan, Illinois
Puget Sound Croquet Club in Kirkland, Washington
San Francisco Croquet Club in San Francisco, California
Westhampton Mallet Club in Westhampton, New York

Related Organizations 
Nine-Wicket Croquet (USCA backyard croquet)
National Croquet Center (home of the USCA)
World Croquet Federation (USCA represents the United States of America)

Croquet in the United States
Croquet
Croquet
1977 establishments in the United States
Sports organizations established in 1977